Dacampiaceae is a family of fungi belonging to the order Pleosporales. The family was first described in 1855 by Gustav Wilhelm Körber.

Genera
Genera listed by Mycobank:

Byssothecium
Cocciscia Norman, 1870
Dacampia
Dacampiosphaeria
Immotthia
Kalaallia
Leptocucurthis
Lophothelium
Moristroma
Perinidium
Pseudonitschkia
Pyrenidiomyces
Pyrenidium
Sinodidymella
Weddellomyces
Xenosphaeria

Additional genera listed by GBIF:
 Aaosphaeria Aptroot, 1995
 Clypeococcum D.Hawksw.

References

Pleosporales
Dothideomycetes families
Lichen families
Taxa named by Gustav Wilhelm Körber
Taxa described in 1855
Lichenicolous fungi